Betsele IF is a Swedish football club located in Lycksele in Västerbotten County.

Background
Founded in 1961 Betsele Idrottsförening provides football for women and girls. The club's  football ground and clubhouse is located in the village of Ågläntan which is just over a mile from Lycksele.

Since their foundation Betsele IF has participated mainly in the middle and lower divisions of the Swedish football league system.   the club plays in Division 3, which is the fifth tier of Swedish football. They play their home matches at the Ågläntan in Lycksele.

Betsele IF are affiliated to Västerbottens Fotbollförbund.

Recent history
In recent seasons Betsele IF have competed in the following divisions:

2010 – Division IV, Västerbotten Norra
2009 – Division IV, Västerbotten Norra
2009 – Division IV, Västerbotten Elit
2008 – Division IV, Västerbotten Norra
2007 – Division IV, Västerbotten Norra
2006 – Division III, Norra Norrland
2005 – Division III, Norra Norrland
2004 – Division III, Mellersta Norrland
2003 – Division III, Norra Norrland
2002 – Division III, Norra Norrland
2001 – Division III, Mellersta Norrland
2000 – Division III, Mellersta Norrland
1999 – Division III, Norra Norrland
1998 – Division III, Norra Norrland
1997 – Division III, Norra Norrland

Attendances

In recent seasons Betsele IF have had the following average attendances:

Footnotes

External links
 Betsele IF – Official website
  Betsele IF Facebook

Football clubs in Västerbotten County
Association football clubs established in 1961
1961 establishments in Sweden